Sir John Ivan George Cadogan  (8 October 1930 – 9 February 2020) was a British organic chemist.

Early life
Cadogan was born in Pembrey, Carmarthenshire, Wales, United Kingdom. He was educated at Swansea Grammar School, where he achieved State Scholar in 1948, and at King's College London, where he earned a 1st Class Honours degree as well as a PhD, and was awarded the Millar Thomson Medal, and the Samuel Smiles Prize.

Interests
Cadogan was particularly interested in the popularisation of science. He calculated that he has given live lecture demonstrations to over 10,000 school children and to many more via television. He took part in the first live satellite telecast from London to New Zealand, at which time he treasured the sight of more TV vans outside the Royal Institution than even outside the Arms Park for a Wales-England match. He was a Liveryman of the Salters' Company and a director of the Salters' Institute whose considerable charitable works are dedicated to the improvement of teaching of Chemistry and Chemical Engineering. He was a Freeman of the City of London.

Positions and memberships
From 1979 to 2002, he was Visiting Professor of Chemistry at Imperial College, London, and from 1979 to 2007, he was Honorary Professorial Fellow in Chemistry at the University of Wales, Swansea. He was Science Policy Advisor to the Science Foundation, Ireland, from its inception until 2006.

Honours
Cadogan was awarded Honorary Doctorates at the Universities of St Andrews, Edinburgh, Stirling, Aberdeen, Wales, Aix-Marseille, Cranfield, Durham, Glamorgan, Leicester, London, Nottingham, Nottingham Trent, Sunderland, and Wales and Honorary Fellowships from University of Swansea; University of Cardiff; King's College, London; Imperial College, London; and the Swansea Metropolitan University. He was also an Honorary Fellow of the Royal Academy of Engineering.

In 2013, Cadogan was awarded the Royal Medal of the Royal Society of Edinburgh by Prince Philip, the Duke of Edinburgh, for his "outstanding contribution to Organic Chemistry through his research, discovery and invention, and the impact for wider academia of his work with the UK Research Councils and industry."

References

1930 births
2020 deaths
Alumni of King's College London
British chemists
Commanders of the Order of the British Empire
Fellows of the Learned Society of Wales
Fellows of the Royal Society
Fellows of the Royal Society of Chemistry
Knights Bachelor
Organic chemists
People educated at Bishop Gore School
Presidents of the Royal Society of Chemistry